Oswaldia is a genus of flies in the family Tachinidae.

Species
Oswaldia albifacies (Townsend, 1908)
Oswaldia anorbitalis (Brooks, 1945)
Oswaldia apicalis (Mesnil, 1957)
Oswaldia assimilis (Townsend, 1919)
Oswaldia aurifrons (Townsend, 1908)
Oswaldia conica (Reinhard, 1934)
Oswaldia eggeri (Brauer & von Bergenstamm, 1889)
Oswaldia flavitibia Shima, 1991
Oswaldia gilva Shima, 1991
Oswaldia glauca Shima, 1991
Oswaldia hirsuta Mesnil, 1970
Oswaldia illiberis Chao & Zhou, 1998
Oswaldia immissa (Reinhard, 1959)
Oswaldia intermedia Ziegler & Shima, 1996
Oswaldia issikii (Baranov, 1935)
Oswaldia minor (Curran, 1925)
Oswaldia muscaria (Fallén, 1810)
Oswaldia reducta (Villeneuve, 1930)
Oswaldia sartura (Reinhard, 1959)
Oswaldia spectabilis (Meigen, 1824)
Oswaldia strigosa Shima, 1991
Oswaldia valida (Curran, 1927)

References

Diptera of Europe
Diptera of North America
Diptera of Asia
Exoristinae
Tachinidae genera
Taxa named by Jean-Baptiste Robineau-Desvoidy